This is a list of banks in Tanzania whether licensed commercial banks, community banks, microfinance banks, mortgage banks or development banks.

Commercial banks

 Absa Bank Tanzania
 AccessBank Tanzania
 Akiba Commercial Bank
 Amana Bank
 Azania Bank
 Bank of Africa Tanzania Limited
 Bank of Baroda Tanzania Limited
 Bank of India (Tanzania)
 Canara Bank Tanzania Limited
 China Dasheng Bank Limited
 Citibank Tanzania
 CRDB Bank
 DCB Commercial Bank 
 Diamond Trust Bank Tanzania
 Ecobank Tanzania
 Equity Bank (Tanzania)
 Exim Bank (Tanzania)
 Guaranty Trust Bank (Tanzania) Limited 
 Habib African Bank
 I&M Bank (Tanzania)
 International Commercial Bank Tanzania
 KCB Bank Tanzania
 Letshego Bank Tanzania
 Mkombozi Commercial Bank
 Mwalimu Commercial Bank
 National Bank of Commerce (Tanzania)
 National Microfinance Bank
 NCBA Bank Tanzania
 People's Bank of Zanzibar
 Stanbic Bank Tanzania Limited
 Standard Chartered Bank Tanzania
 Tanzania Commercial Bank
 UBA Bank Tanzania (UBA)

Mortgage Banks 

 First Housing Company Tanzania Limited
 Tanzania Mortgage Refinance Company

Development financial institutions
 Tanzania Agricultural Development Bank
 TIB Development Bank

Community banks
 Kilimanjaro Cooperative Bank
 Maendeleo Bank Plc
 Mufindi Community Bank Plc (MuCoBa)
 Tandahimba Community Bank Limited
 Uchumi Commercial Bank Limited

Microfinance banks
 Finca Microfinance Bank (Tanzania)
Mwanga Hakika Microfinance Bank
VisionFund Tanzania Microfinance Bank
 Yetu Microfinance Bank PLC
UOB Global Capital Finance Limited

See also
 Bank of Tanzania
 Economy of Tanzania

References

External links

 Website of Bank of Tanzania
   Exim Bank Tanzania Plans Merger With First National Bank Tanzania As of 19 January 2020.

 
Banks
Tanzania
Tanzania